StarStruck was a short-lived 2005 Australian television series, that screened on the Nine Network. It was hosted by Larry Emdur and Catriona Rowntree. It was based on the successful Stars in Their Eyes in the United Kingdom, which in turn was based on the Dutch TV show Soundmixshow. Contestants were introduced and then whisked away to be transformed into the star of their choice. They would emerge for their performance, supported by dancers, a choir and an orchestra.

Contestants were judged on their performances by Doug Mulray and Vanessa Amorosi.

The program debuted strongly winning the 7.30pm timeslot with an average of 1.58 million viewers across Australia.

See also

 List of Australian television series
 List of Nine Network programs

References

2005 Australian television series debuts
2005 Australian television series endings
2000s Australian reality television series
Nine Network original programming